The Kazakhstan National Road Race Championships are held annually to decide the Kazakh cycling champions in the road race discipline, across various categories.

Multiple winners 

Riders that won the race more than once.

Men

See also
 Kazakhstan National Time Trial Championships

References

Cycle races in Kazakhstan
National road cycling championships